Tamlana is a genus in the phylum Bacteroidota (Bacteria). Two species have been described so far: T. agarivorans and T. crocina.

As all members of the Bacteroidota they are Gram negative.'

They are non-flaggelate rod shaped, produced non-diffusible carotenoids (446 nm max abs, giving T. crocina its name) and use MK-6 as the respiratory quinone.

Etymology
The name Tamlana derives from:
 New Latin feminine gender noun Tamlana, named after Tamla, the old name for Jeju Island, referring to the region where the bacterium was isolated.

The specific epithets of the species are
 T. agarivorans: New Latin noun agarum, agar, algal polysaccharide; Latin v. vorare, to devour, to digest; New Latin participle adjective agarivorans, agar-devouring.
 T. crocina: Latin feminine gender adjective crocina, saffron-coloured.

See also
 Bacterial taxonomy
 Microbiology

References 

Bacteria genera
Flavobacteria